The Brazil women's national football team (Portuguese: Seleção Brasileira Feminina de futebol) represents Brazil in international women's football and is run by the Brazilian Football Confederation (CBF). It has participated in eight editions of the FIFA Women's World Cup, finishing as runner-up in 2007, and seven editions of the Copa América Femenina.

Brazil played their first game on 22 July 1986 against the United States, losing 2–1.

The team finished the 1999 World Cup in third place and the 2007 in second, losing to Germany in the final, 2–0.
Brazil won the silver medal twice in the Olympic Games, in 2004 and 2008, after getting fourth place in the two previous editions.

Brazil is the most successful women's national team in South America, having won the first four editions of the Copa América championship. Since 1999, they have been contenders for the World title. In 1998 and 1999, the team finished as the runners-up at the Women's U.S. Cup.

History
Although today the Brazilian Women's National Team is one of the best in the world, it was not that long ago that women were not even allowed to watch a game. The women's game filtered sporadically throughout Brazil with popular traction in the early 20th century. Magazines such as O imparcial and Jornal dos sports covered the women's game praising their achievements in local cup competitions. Yet, the traditional order of futbol as "purely masculine" came into contention resulting in the games downfall. Until, the mid-1940s when Brazil became a dictatorship subsequently banning the women's game. Banned by the Minister of Education and Health in 1941, eugenic ideologies from the new dictatorship called for the protection of womanly bodies, thus sports became a disqualified endeavor. The game was male dominated, and those who could not perform well were even called feminine at times. Throughout the time of the ban, women were observed playing quite frequently forcing the Conselho Nacional de Desportos (CND) to take charge and reissue bans that were not working. In 1965, Deliberation no. 7 further forced an end to all women's sports in Brazil, not just football. This ban would not be lifted until the late 1970s, when Brazil passed Amnesty Laws allowing political exiles back into the country. A surge of Brazilian feminists returned to their country eager to change the social landscape inspired by the Western feminist movements of the 60s and 70s. Fan bases for the women's team with a new identity rooted themselves in the fabric of history and with the support of the general public the women's game led a rise in feminism that swept across the country. Finally in 1979 the National Sports Council of Brazil passed Deliberation no. 10 reinstating the women's game. Today the National team has won the Copa America 7 times and has made it to the world cup finals where they were beaten by Germany. Perhaps the most impressive statistic that even though the team played its first official match ever in 1986 only 5 years later they won their first title in Copa America and only 9 years after that they were challenging the world's best.

Futebol Feminino
Brazil was Latin America's first country to legally recognize futebol feminino. As the first nation to popularize the women's game it was a hard sell for many Brazilian's caught up with traditional gender roles. Up until the national team started participating on the international stage. After the debut of women's association football in the 1996 Summer Olympics in Atlanta the women's game skyrocketed in admiration. In order to capitalize off of the teams commencement and fourth-place finish the State of São Paulo created Paulistana. The Paulistana was a domestic competition meant to attract young up and coming players for the national team. However, the methodology of Paulistana linked itself to the process futbol feminization. The administrators and managers who ran the competition scalped white, beautiful, and non-masculine players. An attempt to beautify the women's sport for the largely male population of futbol consumers. The 1999 World Cup golden boot winner Sissi noticed the negative effects of beautification over athletics and left for overseas competition. The introduction of the Campeonato Brasileiro de Futebol Feminino in 2013 reinvigorated the domestic competition attracting the Brazilian stars of the national team back into the country.

2017 controversy 
In 2017, the Brazilian Football Confederation's decision to fire head coach Emily Lima sparked protest among the team's players. The dispute evolved into an argument for greater wages, and more respect and recognition for the country's female football players. As a result, players such as Cristiane, Rosana, and Francielle announced their retirement from international football, hoping that this decision might make a difference in the years to come.

Team image

Nicknames
The Brazil women's national football team has been known or nicknamed as the "Seleção (The National Squad)", "As Canarinhas (The Female Canaries)" or "Verde-Amarela (Green-and-Yellow)".

Kits and crest

Kit suppliers

Under the CBF requirements both men's and women's national teams are supplied by the same kit manufacturer. The current sponsorship deal is signed with Nike. Although, the details of the kit differ in style. The crest of the women's national team is produced without the five star accolades from previous men's World Cup titles. In honor of the burgeoning history of the women's team they will only attach star merits based on their own performances.

FIFA world rankings

 Worst Ranking   Best Ranking   Worst Mover   Best Mover

Results and fixtures

The following is a list of match results in the last 12 months, as well as any future matches that have been scheduled.

Legend

2022

2023

Head-to-head record
 Counted for the FIFA A-level matches only.

Coaching staff

Current coaching staff

Manager history

Updated on 1 March 2023, after the match against .

Players

The Brazilian Football Confederation does not publish appearance statistics for its female players, so statistics here are unofficial.

Caps and goals as of 1 March 2023, considering only FIFA A-matches, after the match against .

Current squad
The following players were called up for the 2023 SheBelieves Cup.

Recent call-ups
The following players were named to a squad in the last 12 months.

 ALT: Alternate
 COVID: Player withdrew from the current squad due to testing positively for COVID-19 or having to self-isolate because of it
 INJ: Withdrew due to injury
 PRE: Preliminary squad / standby

Records

*Players in bold are still active, at least at club level.

Most caps

Most goals

Competitive record

FIFA Women's World Cup

Olympic Games

Copa América Femenina

CONCACAF W Championship

Pan American Games

South American Games

Algarve Cup
The Algarve Cup is an invitational tournament for national teams in women's association football hosted by the Portuguese Football Federation (FPF). Held annually in the Algarve region of Portugal since 1994, it is one of the most prestigious and longest-running women's international football events and has been nicknamed the "Mini FIFA Women's World Cup".

SheBelieves Cup
The SheBelieves Cup is a global invitational tournament for national teams in women's football hosted in the United States.

Tournament of Nations
The Tournament of Nations is a global invitational tournament for national teams in women's football hosted in the United States in non-World Cup and non-Olympic years.

Torneio Internacional de Futebol Feminino

Honours

 FIFA Women's World Cup
 Runners-up (1): 2007
 Third place (1): 1999
Olympic Games
  Silver Medalists (2): 2004, 2008
 Fourth place (3): 1996, 2000, 2016
 Copa América Femenina
 Winners (8): 1991, 1995, 1998, 2003, 2010, 2014, 2018, 2022
 Runners-up (1): 2006
 CONCACAF W Championship
 Runners-up (1): 2000
 Torneio Internacional de Futebol Feminino
 Winners (8): 2009, 2011, 2012, 2013, 2014, 2015, 2016, 2021
 Runners-up (2): 2010, 2019
Yongchuan International Tournament
 Winners: 2017
Pan American Games
  Gold Medalists (3): 2003, 2007, 2015
  Silver Medalists (1): 2011
South American Games
  Bronze Medalists (1): 2014

See also

Sport in Brazil
Football in Brazil
Women's football in Brazil
Brazilian Football Confederation
Brazil women's national under-20 football team
Brazil women's national under-17 football team
Brazil women's national futsal team
Brazil men's national football team

References

External links

 Official website
 FIFA profile
 All Matches of the Brazilian Soccer Team
 All Matches of the Brazilian Soccer Team

 
South American women's national association football teams
Football